Gerard C. Connolly (born 16 April 1937) is a former Irish Fianna Fáil politician. 
A farmer and auctioneer, Connolly was first elected to the 19th Dáil as a Teachta Dála (TD) for the Laois–Offaly constituency on his first attempt at the 1969 general election and re-elected until retiring at the 1997 general election.

When Charles Haughey became Taoiseach in 1979, Connolly was appointed Minister of State at the Department of the Environment and was re-appointed to the same position during the Haughey Governments of 1982, 1987 to 1989, and 1989 to 1992.

He was not appointed a Minister of State under the succeeding Albert Reynolds government and retired in 1997.

References

1937 births
Living people
Fianna Fáil TDs
Members of the 19th Dáil
Members of the 20th Dáil
Members of the 21st Dáil
Members of the 22nd Dáil
Members of the 23rd Dáil
Members of the 24th Dáil
Members of the 25th Dáil
Members of the 26th Dáil
Members of the 27th Dáil
Local councillors in County Offaly
Irish farmers
Ministers of State of the 26th Dáil
Ministers of State of the 25th Dáil
Ministers of State of the 23rd Dáil
Ministers of State of the 21st Dáil